A Roman Scandal may refer to:
 A Roman Scandal (film), a 1919 American short silent comedy film
 A Roman Scandal (band), a synthpop band from Austin, Texas

See also
 Roman Scandals, a 1933 American musical film